The 1975 Canadian Soccer League season was the fifty-second season for the National Soccer League (NSL) which operated under the Canadian Soccer League (CSL) name for the season. The season began in April and concluded in late October with Toronto Italia securing a double (NSL Championship, and First Division title). Italia would also win the Canadian Open Cup by defeating the Challenge Trophy champions London Boxing and Athletic Club of Victoria from British Columbia. The Serbian White Eagles were the NSL Cup winners and the Canadian representative for the 1975 CONCACAF Champions' Cup. 

In the Second Division, the Windsor Stars were the divisional champions by finishing first in the standings, which secured automatic promotion to the First Division. A postseason tournament was utilized in the Second Division were St. Catherines Heidelberg won the NSL II Championship after defeating Windsor. As the membership in the league increased the NSL was divided into two separate divisions (First and Second Division) with a promotion and relegation system. Toronto Croatia would purchase 50% of the Toronto Metros to form Toronto Metros-Croatia in the North American Soccer League, while still retaining a reserve team in the NSL.

Overview 
The National Soccer League (NSL) went through a series of reforms beginning with the partitioning of the league into two separate divisions (First and Second divisions) with a promotion and relegation system. The top ten teams from the previous year were placed in the First Division, while the remainder and expansion clubs were relegated to the Second Division. How the promotion and relegation system was operated in the NSL was that the last-placed team in the First Division was automatically relegated, while the Second Division champion would receive an automatic promotion to the First Division. The second last team in the First Division would play in a series of matches against the runner-ups in the Second Division to determine which team would be relegated or promoted. A name change was included in the reforms with the league operating under the Canadian Soccer League (CSL) name to distinguish itself from other regional leagues using a similar name. The CSL also provided additional incentives for match competitiveness by issuing prize money to the divisional champions and runner-ups.  

The Toronto-based CSL teams began using Lamport Stadium in 1975, but were forced to split their home matches between CNE Stadium. and Varsity Stadium as Lamport required further repairs throughout the season. The repairs had an economical effect on the Toronto clubs at the live gate with only Toronto Italia generating a profit as their home matches were played at York Stadium. The Serbian White Eagles were embroiled in a dispute with the league executive committee as the White Eagles were banned from league competition after a fan invasion during their 1975 CONCACAF Champions' Cup match against C.F. Monterrey. The decision was appealed and taken to the Canadian Soccer Association (CSA) where the ban was lifted with Serbia required to play in a closed venue without spectators. The league ownership began a policy to limit the usage of import players in an attempt to ultimately Canadianize the league, and placed a limit of six import players per team.   

The boundaries of the league were once more located around the Montreal–Windsor corridor with the CSL returning to Windsor, Ontario with the Windsor Stars being granted a franchise. Oakville United was granted a franchise and a developmental team sponsored by the Ontario government called the Ontario Selects were placed in the Second Division. The league continued to have a presence in Montreal, Quebec with the Montreal Castors acquiring Montreal Cantalia's franchise rights. The rivalry between the NSL and Toronto Metros of the North American Soccer League was further intensified with the Metros ownership attempting to lobby the Ontario Soccer Association (OSA) to place further restrictions on the allowance of imports, and with Toronto Croatia becoming part-owners with the Metros. On several occasions, some NSL teams outdrew the NASL club in attendance numbers.

Teams

Standings

First Division

Second Division

Second division playoffs 
Windsor Stars, Montreal Castors, Oakville United, and St. Catharines Heidelberg were the top four clubs that qualified for the postseason. Though Montreal secured a playoff berth they opted out of the tournament because of a shortage of players due to injuries, and the departure of their imports. The decision resulted in St. Catharines receiving a bye to the finals.

Semifinals

Finals

Canadian Open Cup  
The Canadian Open Cup was a tournament organized by the National Soccer League in 1971 where the NSL champion would face the Challenge Trophy winners to determine the best team throughout the country. The 1974 edition served as a qualifier match to determine the Canadian representative to the CONCACAF Champions' Cup. Toronto Italia was the NSL representative for the 1975 competition while their opponents were the London Boxing Club of Victoria, who were the British Columbia Provincial Soccer Championship, and Challenge Trophy titleholders.

References

External links
RSSSF CNSL page
thecnsl.com - 1975 season

1975–76 domestic association football leagues
National Soccer League
1975